The Siege of Zara (1202) was the first major action of the Fourth Crusade.

Siege of Zadar or Siege of Zara may also refer to these sieges of the city of Zadar in modern Croatia, often known by its historical name of Zara:

 Siege of Zadar (998), a military conflict during the Macedonian campaign, resulting in a Croatian victory
 Siege of Zadar (1345–46), a successful attempt by the Republic of Venice to capture Zadar
 Siege of Zara (1813), a conflict during the Napoleonic Wars resulting in the surrender of a French garrison

See also
Battle of Zadar (1991)
Bombing of Zadar in World War II
1991 riot in Zadar